The name Ulysses has been used for two tropical cyclones in the Philippines by PAGASA in the Western Pacific Ocean. It replaced the name Unding.

Typhoon Dolphin (2008) (T0822, 27W, Ulysses) – a Category 2-equivalent typhoon, sank a cargo passenger ship, killing at least 47 people
Typhoon Vamco (2020) (T2022, 25W, Ulysses) – a destructive Category 4-equivalent typhoon, made landfall on Luzon and in Vietnam

The name Ulysses was retired from use in the Philippine Area of Responsibility following the 2020 typhoon season and will be replaced with Upang in the 2024 season.

References

Pacific typhoon set index articles